The 2022 UMB World Three-cushion Championship for National Teams 2022 was the 34th edition of the tournament. It was held from 10 March to 13 March in Viersen, Germany, the permanent location of the championship since 1990.

Format 
Since 2016, only 16 teams take part to the tournament. The defending champions and the host country are seeded.
In the group stage, up to 40 points are played and draws are possible.
From the knockout round, there is an extra time in the Scotch Doubles System (SD) in the event of a draw. All four players play in alternating mode up to 15 points. The team that first reaches 15 points wins the match. Group ranking is determined as follows:
 Matchpoints (MP)
 Team General Average (MGD)
 Maximum series (HS)
Since 2004, 3rd place final is not played.

Participants

Group stage

Results

Group A

Group B

Group C

Group D

Final round

See also

2022 UMB World Three-cushion Championship

References

External links

UMB

UMB World Three-cushion Championship
UMB
UMB
UMB